The following species in the flowering plant genus Pilea are accepted by Plants of the World Online. About 30% of the species in this genus may yet be undescribed.

Pilea abbreviata 
Pilea acanthospermoides 
Pilea acuminata 
Pilea acunae 
Pilea adamsiana 
Pilea aenea 
Pilea affinis 
Pilea alaotrae 
Pilea alfaroana 
Pilea alongensis 
Pilea alpestris 
Pilea alpina 
Pilea alsinifolia 
Pilea alta 
Pilea alternifolia 
Pilea ambecarpa 
Pilea amplistipulata 
Pilea andersonii 
Pilea andringitrensis 
Pilea angolensis 
Pilea angulata 
Pilea angustata 
Pilea angustifolia 
Pilea anisophylla 
Pilea ansincola 
Pilea anthotricha 
Pilea antioquensis 
Pilea aparadensis 
Pilea apiculata 
Pilea apoensis 
Pilea appendicilata 
Pilea approximata 
Pilea aquarum 
Pilea arbuscula 
Pilea argentea 
Pilea arguta 
Pilea articulata 
Pilea astrogramma 
Pilea atroviridis 
Pilea attenuata 
Pilea auricularis 
Pilea auriculata 
Pilea balansae 
Pilea balfourii 
Pilea baltenweckii 
Pilea bambuseti 
Pilea bambusifolia 
Pilea barahonensis 
Pilea barbiflora 
Pilea basicordata 
Pilea bassleriana 
Pilea baurii 
Pilea beguinotii 
Pilea bemarivensis 
Pilea benguetensis 
Pilea betulifolia 
Pilea bicolor 
Pilea bisepala 
Pilea bissei 
Pilea boehmerioides 
Pilea boiviniana 
Pilea boniana 
Pilea borbonica 
Pilea botterii 
Pilea brachypila 
Pilea bracteosa 
Pilea brasiliensis 
Pilea brassii 
Pilea brevicornuta 
Pilea brevipetiolata 
Pilea brevistipula 
Pilea brittoniae 
Pilea buchenavii 
Pilea buchtienii 
Pilea bullata 
Pilea cacuminum 
Pilea cadetii 
Pilea cadierei 
Pilea caespitosa 
Pilea calcicola 
Pilea callicometes 
Pilea cangyuanensis 
Pilea capitata 
Pilea capitellata 
Pilea carautae 
Pilea cardiophylla 
Pilea caribaea 
Pilea carnosa 
Pilea carnosula 
Pilea castronis 
Pilea cataractae 
Pilea caudata 
Pilea caulescens 
Pilea cavaleriei 
Pilea cavernicola 
Pilea celebica 
Pilea cellulosa 
Pilea centradenioides 
Pilea cephalantha 
Pilea cephalophora 
Pilea ceratocalyx 
Pilea chamaesyce 
Pilea chartacea 
Pilea chiapensis 
Pilea chotardiana 
Pilea christii 
Pilea ciliata 
Pilea citriodora 
Pilea clandestina 
Pilea clarana 
Pilea clarkei 
Pilea clementis 
Pilea cocottei 
Pilea confusa 
Pilea conjugalis 
Pilea consanguinea 
Pilea cordifolia 
Pilea cordistipulata 
Pilea cornutocucullata 
Pilea corona 
Pilea coronopifolia 
Pilea corymbosa 
Pilea costaricensis 
Pilea costata 
Pilea cowellii 
Pilea craspedodroma 
Pilea crassifolia 
Pilea crenata 
Pilea crenulata 
Pilea cruegeriana 
Pilea cubensis 
Pilea cuneata 
Pilea cuneiformis 
Pilea cuprea 
Pilea cushiensis 
Pilea cyclophylla 
Pilea cymbifolia 
Pilea daguensis 
Pilea dataensis 
Pilea dauciodora 
Pilea delicatula 
Pilea densiflora 
Pilea depressa 
Pilea diandra 
Pilea dictyocarpa 
Pilea diffusa 
Pilea digitata 
Pilea discolor 
Pilea dispar 
Pilea distantifolia 
Pilea diversifolia 
Pilea dolichocarpa 
Pilea dombeyana 
Pilea domingensis 
Pilea ecboliophylla 
Pilea effusa 
Pilea ekmanii 
Pilea elegans 
Pilea elegantissima 
Pilea elizabethae 
Pilea elliptica 
Pilea elliptilimba 
Pilea entradana 
Pilea ermitensis 
Pilea erosa 
Pilea fairchildiana 
Pilea falcata 
Pilea fallax 
Pilea fasciata 
Pilea fendleri 
Pilea filicina 
Pilea filipes 
Pilea flammula 
Pilea flavicaulis 
Pilea flexuosa 
Pilea floridana 
Pilea foetida 
Pilea foliosa 
Pilea fontana 
Pilea foreroi 
Pilea forgetii 
Pilea formonensis 
Pilea formosa 
Pilea forsythiana 
Pilea frutescens 
Pilea fruticosa 
Pilea fruticulosa 
Pilea funkikensis 
Pilea gallowayana 
Pilea gamboana 
Pilea gansuensis 
Pilea geminata 
Pilea gesnerioides 
Pilea glaberrima 
Pilea glabra 
Pilea glomerata 
Pilea gnidioides 
Pilea godetiana 
Pilea goetzei 
Pilea gomeziana 
Pilea gongjueensis 
Pilea goudotiana 
Pilea gracilior 
Pilea gracilis 
Pilea grandifolia 
Pilea granmae 
Pilea granulata 
Pilea griffithii 
Pilea guirana 
Pilea guizhouensis 
Pilea gyrophylla 
Pilea haenkei 
Pilea hamaoi 
Pilea harrisii 
Pilea hedemarkii 
Pilea helwigii 
Pilea helxinoides 
Pilea hemisphaerica 
Pilea hepatica 
Pilea herniarioides 
Pilea herrerae 
Pilea heteroneura 
Pilea hexagona 
Pilea hilariana 
Pilea hilliana 
Pilea hirsuta 
Pilea hirtella 
Pilea hispaniolana 
Pilea hitchcockii 
Pilea holstii 
Pilea hookeriana 
Pilea howardiana 
Pilea howelliana 
Pilea humbertii 
Pilea humilis 
Pilea hyalina 
Pilea hydra 
Pilea hydrocotyliflora 
Pilea hygrophila 
Pilea imparifolia 
Pilea impressa 
Pilea inaequalis 
Pilea insolens 
Pilea intermedia 
Pilea intumescens 
Pilea involucrata 
Pilea irrorata 
Pilea iteophylla 
Pilea ivohibeensis 
Pilea jamesoniana 
Pilea japonica 
Pilea jayaensis 
Pilea jeremiensis 
Pilea johniana 
Pilea johnsii 
Pilea johnstonii 
Pilea jujuyensis 
Pilea kakurang 
Pilea kanaii 
Pilea killipiana 
Pilea kingii 
Pilea klossii 
Pilea krugii 
Pilea laciniata 
Pilea lacorum 
Pilea laevicaulis 
Pilea lageensis 
Pilea lamii 
Pilea lamiifolia 
Pilea lamioides 
Pilea lanceolata 
Pilea lancifolia 
Pilea lapestris 
Pilea latifolia 
Pilea laurea 
Pilea laxa 
Pilea ledermannii 
Pilea leptocardia 
Pilea leptogramma 
Pilea leptophylla 
Pilea leucophaea 
Pilea libanensis 
Pilea lindeniana 
Pilea linearifolia 
Pilea lippioides 
Pilea lobulata 
Pilea loeseneri 
Pilea loheri 
Pilea lokohensis 
Pilea lomatogramma 
Pilea longibracteolata 
Pilea longicaulis 
Pilea longifolia 
Pilea longipedunculata 
Pilea longruiensis 
Pilea longzhouensis 
Pilea losensis 
Pilea lucens 
Pilea lucida 
Pilea luisiana 
Pilea luochengensis 
Pilea lurida 
Pilea lushuiensis 
Pilea luzonensis 
Pilea macbridei 
Pilea macrantha 
Pilea macrocarpa 
Pilea macrocystolithica 
Pilea maculata 
Pilea magnicarpa 
Pilea manniana 
Pilea margarettae 
Pilea marginata 
Pilea martini 
Pilea matama 
Pilea matheuxiana 
Pilea matsudae 
Pilea matthewii 
Pilea maxonii 
Pilea mayarensis 
Pilea media 
Pilea mediophylla 
Pilea medongensis 
Pilea melastomoides 
Pilea menghaiensis 
Pilea mexicana 
Pilea michaelensis 
Pilea microcardia 
Pilea micromeriifolia 
Pilea microphylla 
Pilea microrhombea 
Pilea miguelii 
Pilea mimema 
Pilea minguetii 
Pilea minima 
Pilea minuta 
Pilea minutiflora 
Pilea minutissima 
Pilea mollis 
Pilea mongolica 
Pilea monilifera 
Pilea monticola 
Pilea montis-wilhelmi 
Pilea moragana 
Pilea moroniana 
Pilea multicaulis 
Pilea multicellularis 
Pilea multiflora 
Pilea mutisiana 
Pilea myriantha 
Pilea myriophylla 
Pilea nana 
Pilea napoana 
Pilea neglecta 
Pilea nerteroides 
Pilea nguruensis 
Pilea nicholasii 
Pilea nidiae 
Pilea nigrescens 
Pilea nipensis 
Pilea nitida 
Pilea nonggangensis 
Pilea notata 
Pilea nudicaulis 
Pilea nummulariifolia 
Pilea nutans 
Pilea obetiifolia 
Pilea oblanceolata 
Pilea obscura 
Pilea obtusangula 
Pilea occulta 
Pilea ophioderma 
Pilea ophiticola 
Pilea ordinata 
Pilea orientalis 
Pilea ornatifolia 
Pilea ovalifolia 
Pilea ovalis 
Pilea oxyodon 
Pilea pachycarpa 
Pilea pachycephala 
Pilea pallida 
Pilea palustris 
Pilea pandurata 
Pilea paniculigera 
Pilea pansamalana 
Pilea panzhihuaensis 
Pilea papuana 
Pilea parciflora 
Pilea parietaria 
Pilea pauciflora 
Pilea pauciserrata 
Pilea pavonii 
Pilea pedroi 
Pilea peladerosi 
Pilea pellionioides 
Pilea peltata 
Pilea pennellii 
Pilea penninervis 
Pilea peperomioides 
Pilea peploides 
Pilea perfragilis 
Pilea perrieri 
Pilea phaeocarpa 
Pilea pichisana 
Pilea picta 
Pilea pitresia 
Pilea pittieri 
Pilea plataniflora 
Pilea pleuroneura 
Pilea plicatidentata 
Pilea plumieri 
Pilea plumulosa 
Pilea poeppigiana 
Pilea pollicaris 
Pilea polyclada 
Pilea portlandiana 
Pilea proctorii 
Pilea propinqua 
Pilea pseudonotata 
Pilea psilogyne 
Pilea pteridophylla 
Pilea pterocaulis 
Pilea pteropodon 
Pilea pubescens 
Pilea pulchra 
Pilea pulegifolia 
Pilea pumila 
Pilea pumileoides 
Pilea punctata 
Pilea puracensis 
Pilea purpurea 
Pilea purulensis 
Pilea pusilla 
Pilea putridicola 
Pilea pyrrhotricha 
Pilea quadrata 
Pilea quercifolia 
Pilea racemiformis 
Pilea racemosa 
Pilea radicans 
Pilea radiculosa 
Pilea ramosissima 
Pilea receptacularis 
Pilea refracta 
Pilea repanda 
Pilea reticulata 
Pilea rhexioides 
Pilea rhizobola 
Pilea rhombea 
Pilea rhombifolia 
Pilea richardii 
Pilea riedlei 
Pilea rigida 
Pilea rigidiuscula 
Pilea riopalenquensis 
Pilea riparia 
Pilea rivoriae 
Pilea rivularis 
Pilea robinsonii 
Pilea robusta 
Pilea roemeri 
Pilea rojasiana 
Pilea rostellata 
Pilea rostulata 
Pilea rotundata 
Pilea rotundinucula 
Pilea rubiacea 
Pilea rubriflora 
Pilea rufa 
Pilea rufescens 
Pilea rugosa 
Pilea rugosissima 
Pilea rusbyi 
Pilea salentana 
Pilea salwinensis 
Pilea samanensis 
Pilea sanctae-crucis 
Pilea sancti-johannis 
Pilea saxicola 
Pilea scandens 
Pilea schimpffii 
Pilea schlechteri 
Pilea scripta 
Pilea selbyanorum 
Pilea selleana 
Pilea semidentata 
Pilea semisessilis 
Pilea senarifolia 
Pilea serpyllacea 
Pilea serpyllifolia 
Pilea serratifolia 
Pilea serrulata 
Pilea sessiliflora 
Pilea sessilifolia 
Pilea setigera 
Pilea sevillensis 
Pilea shaferi 
Pilea shizongensis 
Pilea siguaneana 
Pilea silvicola 
Pilea simplex 
Pilea sinocrassifolia 
Pilea sinofasciata 
Pilea skutchii 
Pilea sohayakiensis 
Pilea solandri 
Pilea somae 
Pilea spathulata 
Pilea spathulifolia 
Pilea sphenophylla 
Pilea spicata 
Pilea spinulosa 
Pilea spruceana 
Pilea squamosa 
Pilea squamulata 
Pilea stapfiana 
Pilea stellarioides 
Pilea stelluligera 
Pilea stenoneura 
Pilea stenophylla 
Pilea stolonifera 
Pilea striata 
Pilea strigillosa 
Pilea strigosa 
Pilea subamplexicaulis 
Pilea subcoriacea 
Pilea subedentata 
Pilea subintegerrima 
Pilea sublobata 
Pilea sublucens 
Pilea submissa 
Pilea subpubera 
Pilea succulenta 
Pilea suffruticosa 
Pilea sumideroensis 
Pilea supersedens 
Pilea suta 
Pilea swinglei 
Pilea sylvatica 
Pilea symmeria 
Pilea tabularis 
Pilea tatamensis 
Pilea tatei 
Pilea tenerrima 
Pilea ternifolia 
Pilea tetraphylla 
Pilea tetrapoda 
Pilea thouarsiana 
Pilea thymoidea 
Pilea tilarana 
Pilea tippenhaueri 
Pilea tobagensis 
Pilea topensis 
Pilea torbeciana 
Pilea trianthemoides 
Pilea trichomanophylla 
Pilea trichosanthes 
Pilea trichotoma 
Pilea tridentata 
Pilea trilobata 
Pilea tripartita 
Pilea triradiata 
Pilea troyensis 
Pilea truncata 
Pilea tsaratananensis 
Pilea tsiangiana 
Pilea tungurahuae 
Pilea tutensis 
Pilea ulei 
Pilea umbellata 
Pilea umbriana 
Pilea umbrosa 
Pilea unciformis 
Pilea uninervis 
Pilea urticella 
Pilea urticifolia 
Pilea usambarensis 
Pilea valenzuelae 
Pilea variegata 
Pilea vegasana 
Pilea venulosa 
Pilea verbascifolia 
Pilea vermicularis 
Pilea verrucosa 
Pilea versteegii 
Pilea victoriae 
Pilea victoriensis 
Pilea villicaulis 
Pilea virgata 
Pilea vulcanica 
Pilea weberbaueri 
Pilea weddellii 
Pilea weimingii 
Pilea wightii 
Pilea wilsonii 
Pilea wollastonii 
Pilea wrightiana 
Pilea wullschlaegelii 
Pilea yarensis 
Pilea yuanbaoshanica 
Pilea yunckeri 
Pilea yunquensis 
Pilea zaranensis

References

Pilea